Sergey Kabyshev (born 4 September 1963, Saratov) is a Russian political figure and a deputy of the 8th State Dumas.
 
After graduating from the Saratov State Academy of Law, Kabyshev served in the prosecutor's office as an assistant to the Volgograd prosecutor and an investigator in the military prosecutor's office of the Volgograd garrison. Later he started teaching at the Higher Investigative School of the Ministry of Internal Affairs of the USSR, Volgograd State University, Higher School of Economics. In 1998, he became a professor at the Kutafin Moscow State Law University. Since September 2021, he has served as deputy of the 8th State Duma.

References
 

 

1963 births
Living people
A Just Russia politicians
21st-century Russian politicians
Eighth convocation members of the State Duma (Russian Federation)
Politicians from Saratov